Khotang District is one of 14 districts of Koshi Province of eastern Nepal. The district has been bordered by Bhojpur District in the east, Udayapur District in the south, Okhaldhunga District in the west and Solukhumbu District in the North. In this district there are 2 municipalities and 8 rural/urban municipalities.

History 
Before the unification of Nepal, Khotang District was a part of Majha Kirat or Khambuwan. The land area between two rivers from Dudh Koshi to Arun was Majha Kirat and it was under suzerainty of Sen King of Chaudandigadhi.

During Rana rule, Nepal had 32 districts and the current Khotang District was divided between two other districts. Half of the north part of the current Khotang District was part of East No. 3 (Okhaldhunga) and half of southern part of current Khotang was part of East No. 4 (Bhojpur). In 1962 the traditional 32 districts were divided into 75 districts thus Khotang county of East No. 4 and some counties from East No. 3 were merged to become the current Khotang District.

Geography and climate
Geographically, Khotang is a hilly district of Eastern Nepal. It lies on the coordinates of 260° 50" N to 270° 28" N latitude and 860° 26" E to 860° 58" E longitude. The elevations of the district is 152 m to 3620 m from the sea level. Sunkoshi River and  Dudh Koshi river makes natural borders in the North, West and South and a series of hills and small river makes border separating it from Bhojpur District in East. Approximately 56% of the district area is covered with forest. And about 42% of the district area is under cultivation.

Demographics
At the time of the 2011 Nepal census, Khotang District had a population of 206,312. Of these, 49.9% spoke Nepali, 16.6% Chamling, 4.4% Magar, 4.0% Tamang, 3.8% Bantawa, 3.5% Sampang, 2.7% Newar, 2.5% Dumi, 2.2% Puma, 1.9% Thulung, 1.5% Wambule, 1.3% Nachhiring, 0.9% Koche, 0.8% Rai, 0.6% Sherpa, 0.5% Khaling, 0.5% Tilung, 0.4% Gurung, 0.3% Bahing, 0.3% Maithili, 0.3% Majhi, 0.2% Sunuwar and 0.6% other languages as their first language.

In terms of ethnicity/caste, 36.8% were Rai, 21.4% Chhetri, 7.2% Hill Brahmin, 5.4% Newar, 5.2% Kami, 5.0% Magar, 4.5% Tamang, 2.8% Sarki, 2.7% Damai/Dholi, 1.7% Gharti/Bhujel, 1.7% Sanyasi/Dasnami, 1.1% Chamling, 1.0% Gurung, 0.9% Nachhiring, 0.7% Sherpa, 0.5% Majhi, 0.3% Sunuwar, 0.1% Badi, 0.1% Koiri/Kushwaha, 0.1% Samgpang, 0.1% Thulung, 0.1% Yadav and 0.3% others.

In terms of religion, 58.8% were Hindu, 31.4% Kirati, 7.3% Buddhist, 2.1% Christian, 0.1% Prakriti and 0.3% others.

In terms of literacy, 68.7% could read and write, and 27.8% could neither read nor write.

Administration
Khotang District is administered by Khotang District Coordination Committee (Khotang DCC). The Khotang DCC is elected by Khotang District Assembly. The head of Khotang  DCC is Mr. Kamal Bhimraj Khadka and Mrs. Indrakala Khadka is deputy head of Khotang DCC.

Khotang District Administration Office under Ministry of Home Affairs co-operate with Khotang DCC to maintain peace, order and security in the district. The officer of District Administration office called CDO and current CDO of Khotang DAO is Shaligram Sharma Paudel

Khotang District Court is a Judicial court to see the cases of people on district level.

Division
The district consists of 10 Municipalities, out of which two are urban municipalities and eight are rural municipalities. These are as follows:

Former divisions (1962-2015)

Prior to the restructuring of the district, Khotang District consisted of the following municipalities and Village development committees:

(Before 2014, Khotang district had 76 VDC and no municipality. Diktel municipality established in 2014 merging some VDC)

Ainselu Kharka
Arkhale
Badahare
Badka Dipali
Bahunidanda
Bakachol
Baksila
Bamrang
Barahapokhari
Baspani
Batase
Chhitapokhari
Chhorambu
Chipring
Chisapani
Chyandanda
Chyasmitar
Damarkhu Shivalaya
Dandagaun
Devisthan
Dharapani
Dhitung
Diktel Municipality
Dikuwa

Diplung
Dipsung
Dorpa Chiuridanda
Dubekol
Dumre Dharapani
Durchhim
Hanchaur
Jyamire
Kaule
Kharmi
Kharpa
Khartamchha
Khidima
Khotang Bazar
Kubhinde,
Laphyang
Lamidanda
Lichki Ramche
Linkuwa Pokhari
Magpa
Mahadevasthan
Mangaltar
Mattim Birta
Mauwabote

Nerpa
Nirmalidada
Nunthala
Patheka
Pauwasera
Phaktang
Rajapani
Rakha Bangdel
Rakha Dipsung
Ratancha Majhagaun
Ribdung Jaleshwari
Ribdung Maheshwari
Salle
Santeshwar Chhitapokhari
Sapteshwar
Saunechaur
Sawakatahare
Simpani
Solma
Sungdel
Suntale
Woplukha
Wopung

Constituency
The whole district is a constituency of the 165 parliament constituencies of Nepal. The district is identifies as Bhojpur 1 seat. The district is divided into two segment for provincial constituency named as Bhojpur 1(A) & Bhojpur 1(B). There are 106,534 electorates in the district.

Transportation
Khotang District (Diktel) is connected by two means of transportation (1) By road (2) By Air.

Roadways
The Sagarmatha Highway  is connected with Mahendra Highway at Kadmaha (Saptari District)  The other Important road is Pushpalal Highway which is also called Mid-Hills Highway of Nepal. This road connects Khotang to eastern and western hill destinations directly.

Airports
Thamkharka Airport
Khanidanda Airport
Lamidanda Airport

Places of Interest
 Halesi-Maratika Caves - A pilgrimage site for Hindus also known as Pashupatinath of East, located in Halesi Tuwachung municipality.
  Barah Pokhari is a lake and a religious destination, as well as a part of trekking trail located in Barahapokhari rural municipality.
  Bhulbhule (Pond & Waterfall)
Hill, mountains, rivers trekking and more

References

 

 
Districts of Nepal established in 1962
Districts of Koshi Province